Trawbreaga Bay (Irish: Trá Bhréige) is a small bay (or sea lough) located on the northern tip of the Inishowen Peninsula, County Donegal, Ireland. It is a designated Special Protection Area (SPA) and its features of interest include: the barnacle goose (Branta leucopsis), the light-bellied brent goose (Branta bernicla hrota), the chough (Pyrrhocorax pyrrhocorax) and diverse wetland and waterbirds.

References 

Bays of County Donegal
Protected areas of County Donegal
Ramsar sites in the Republic of Ireland